Cannabis in Spain is decriminalized for personal cultivation and use, and other purposes other than sale or trade. It's illegal for trade or commercial purposes. Using the legal grey areas in Spanish legislation, cannabis clubs are a popular way for enthusiasts to obtain and use cannabis as a technically-legal private collective. In private places, consumption and possession of reasonable amounts (up to ) is legal.

Cannabis clubs
Several cannabis consumption clubs and user associations have been established throughout Spain. These clubs, the first of which was created in 1991, are non-profit associations that grow cannabis and sell it at cost to its members. The legal status of these clubs is uncertain: in 1997, four members of the first club, the Barcelona Ramón Santos Association of Cannabis Studies, were sentenced to four months in prison and a 3000 euro fine, while at about the same time, the court of Bilbao ruled that another club was not in violation of the law. The Andalusian regional government also commissioned a study by criminal law professors on the "Therapeutic use of cannabis and the creation of establishments of acquisition and consumption. The study concluded that such clubs are legal as long as they distribute only to a restricted list of legal adults, provide only the amount of drugs necessary for immediate consumption, and not earn a profit. The Andalusian government never formally accepted these guidelines and the legal situation of the clubs remains insecure. In 2006 and 2007, members of these clubs were acquitted in trial for possession and sale of cannabis and the police were ordered to return seized crops."

About 500 private "cannabis clubs" exist in Spain, 400 of them in Barcelona alone, and Spain is spoken of as the "new Amsterdam," a destination for marijuana tourists. All actions related to cannabis apart from sale or trade are not considered criminal offenses, and normally are misdemeanors punishable by a fine.

Medical cannabis

In October 2005, the autonomous government in the region of Catalonia launched a program of therapeutic use of Sativex for 600 patients of a wide set of illnesses, from multiple sclerosis to cancer, in order to avoid nausea or to relax tense muscles. The project involves six hospitals, forty researchers and sixty drugstores. The product is presented as an atomizer to be taken orally, and it will be delivered at drugstores inside some hospitals. The full text of the research initiative can be seen, in Catalan, from the Universitat Autònoma de Barcelona.

Legality
Sale and importation of any quantity of cannabis is a criminal offence, punishable by jail time. The purchase, possession and consumption of cannabis in a public place constitutes a misdemeanour punishable by a fine and confiscation of the product. Consumption and cultivation by adults in a private space is legal, the latter due to a legal vacuum and provided that it is shown to be for one's own consumption. Cannabis plants that are located somewhere visible from the street/public place (i.e. from balconies) are considered a serious administrative offense, which leads to a fine from 601 to 30,000€.

Cannabis laws in Spain can vary by autonomous community. For example, in June 2017, Catalonia legalised the cultivation, consumption and distribution of cannabis for members of designated cannabis clubs. The clubs must be self-sufficient non-profit organisations and only distribute cannabis to those aged 18 years old and over. Cannabis clubs in Catalonia are also limited to producing 150kg of dried cannabis a year and must follow rules intended to stop drug tourism.

The political party Podemos supports legalising and regulating cannabis in Spain. In 2021, the political party Más País introduced a motion to legalise the recreational use of cannabis in Spain. It was supported by Unidas Podemos, an electoral alliance of which Podemos is part of. However, the governing Spanish Socialist Workers' Party, often referred to under its abbreviated name, PSOE, voted against the motion.

References